Collomia grandiflora is a western North American annual plant in the phlox family (Polemoniaceae), known by the common names grand collomia, large-flowered mountain trumpet, and large-flowered collomia. It usually appears in sandy habitats and is cultivated as an ornamental.

Description
Atop the stem is an inflorescence of several flowers in white to yellow or orange. Lower flowerheads may branch from the axils of the alternate leaves. Each tubular, flat-faced flower is 2 or 3 cm wide with five fused and curving light-colored petals and five stamens tipped with anthers which bear blue pollen. The fruit is a capsule containing sticky seeds.

Uses 
Some Native Americans used the roots and leaves for medicinal purposes.

References

External links
Jepson Manual Treatment
Photo gallery

grandiflora